The 2011–12 San Francisco Dons men's basketball team represented the University of San Francisco in the 2011–12 college basketball season. This was head coach Rex Walters fourth season at San Francisco. The Dons played their home games at the War Memorial Gymnasium and are members of the West Coast Conference. They finished the season 20–14, 8–8 in West Coast play to finish in fifth place. They lost in the semifinals of the West Coast Basketball tournament to Saint Mary's. They were invited to the 2012 College Basketball Invitational where they lost in the first round to Washington State.

Roster

Schedule and results
Source

|-
!colspan=12| 

|-
!colspan=12| 

|-
!colspan=12|

References

San Francisco Dons men's basketball seasons
San Francisco
San Francisco
San Francisco Dons
San Francisco Dons